The 1999–2000 Segunda Divisão season was the 66th season of the competition and the 50th season of recognised third-tier football in Portugal.

Overview
The league was contested by 58 teams in 3 divisions with AD Ovarense, FC Marco and Nacional Funchal winning the respective divisional competitions and gaining promotion to the Liga de Honra.  The overall championship was won by FC Marco.

League standings

Segunda Divisão – Zona Norte

Segunda Divisão – Zona Centro

Segunda Divisão – Zona Sul

Footnotes

External links
 Portuguese Division Two «B» – footballzz.co.uk

Portuguese Second Division seasons
Port
3